Riley is a surname of English or Irish origin.

The English version has the meaning "rye clearing", or is from a place name of which there is more than one occurrence; locations include Lancashire (specifically High Riley in Accrington) and Devon. In the United Kingdom Census 1881, more than a third of Rileys were in Lancashire; it was most prevalent in the east of the county and over the boundary into the Calder Valley in Yorkshire, and the name could be found in these areas from the 13th century.

The Irish version is a form of the surname O'Reilly. This is derived from the first name ; the Gaelic version of the surname, is Irish for 'grandson (or descendant) of '.

Notable people with the surname "Riley"

A
Aaron Riley (born 1980), American mixed martial artist
Adam Riley (born 1992), English cricketer
Aidan Riley (born 1991), Australian rules footballer
Al Riley (born 1953), American politician
Alan Incell Riley (1897–1960), British Air Force pilot
Alban Riley (1844–1914), Australian politician
Ali Riley (born 1987), American-New Zealand footballer
Alice Riley (1860–1955), American author
Alexander Riley (disambiguation), multiple people
Alrick Riley (born 1964), English television director
Amber Riley (born 1986), American actress and singer
Andrea Riley (born 1988), American basketball player
Andrew Riley (born 1988), Jamaican sprinter
Andy Riley (born 1970), British writer and cartoonist
Antonio R. Riley (born 1963), American politician
Arthur Riley (1903–1984), South African footballer
Arthur Dewhurst Riley (1860–1929), English-New Zealand artist
Ashley Riley (born 1995), Bahamian sprinter
Atsuro Riley, American writer
Audrey Riley, English cellist
Austin Riley (born 1997), American baseball player
Avon Riley (1958–2020), American football player

B
Barbara Riley, American civil servant
Barbra Riley (born 1949), American photographer
Bennet C. Riley (1790–1853), American politician
Bernard Riley (born 1981), American football player
Bill Riley (disambiguation), multiple people
Ben Riley (1933–2017), American jazz drummer
Ben Riley (politician) (1866–1946), British politician
Bernard Riley (born 1981), American football player
Blair Riley (born 1985), Canadian ice hockey player
Bob Riley (disambiguation), multiple people
Boots Riley (born 1971), American vocalist
Brad Riley (born 1974), New Zealand basketball player
Brett Riley (born 1970), American writer
Brett Riley (ice hockey) (born 1991), American ice hockey coach
Brian Riley (disambiguation), multiple people
Bridget Riley (born 1931), British op-art painter
Bridgett Riley (born 1973), American boxer
Brittany Riley (born 1986), American hammer thrower
Bud Riley (1925–2012), American football coach
Burke Riley (1914–2006), American state legislator

C
Camden Riley (born 1996), American soccer player
Catherine Riley (born 1947), American politician
Celeste Riley (born 1960), American politician
Chantel Riley, Jamaican-Canadian actress
Charles Riley (disambiguation), multiple people
Charlotte Riley (born 1981), English actress
Cheryl Riley (disambiguation), multiple people
Chris Riley (disambiguation), multiple people
Christopher Riley (born 1967), English writer and film maker
Chuck Riley (disambiguation), multiple people
Claude Riley (born 1960), American basketball player
Clement A. Riley (1905–1988), American politician
Cliff Riley (born 1927), Australian rules footballer
Corinne Boyd Riley (1893–1979), American politician
Curtis Riley (born 1992), American football player

D
Daniel Riley (disambiguation), multiple people
David Riley (disambiguation), multiple people
Davis Riley (born 1996), American golfer
Dawn Riley (born 1964), American sailor
Delbert Riley, Canadian First Nations leader
Del Riley (clerk), American politician
Denise Riley (born 1948), English professor
Dennis Riley (1943–1999), American composer
Dennis L. Riley (born 1945), American politician
Derek Riley (1922–2018), Canadian rower
Dick Riley (??–2010), American politician
Donna Riley, American professor
Dorothy Comstock Riley (1924–2004), American lawyer
Doug Riley (1945–2007), Canadian musician
Duke Riley, American artist
Duke Riley (American football) (born 1994), American football player
Dylan Riley (disambiguation), multiple people

E
Earl Riley (1890–1965), American politician and businessman
Edna G. Riley (1880–1962), American screenwriter
Edward Riley (disambiguation), multiple people
Edwin Riley (1867–1936), English cricketer
Elaine Riley (1917–2015), American actress
Eleanor Riley, English professor
Elijah Riley (born 1998), American football player
Elizabeth Riley (1792–1855), American abolitionist
Emily Riley (disambiguation), multiple people
Emmett Riley (born 1969), American politician
Eric Riley (born 1970), American basketball player
Erin M. Riley (born 1985), American artist
Eron Riley (born 1987), American football player
Estela Riley (born 1969), Panamanian judoka
Ezra Riley (1866–1937), Canadian politician

F
Felix Riley, British novelist
Fletcher Riley (1893–1966), American judge
Ford Riley, American producer
Frank Riley (disambiguation), multiple people
Frederick Riley (disambiguation), multiple people
Freida J. Riley (1937–1969), American teacher

G
Garrett Riley (born 1989), American football coach
Garrett Riley (hockey) (born 1995), Canadian ice hockey player
Gary Riley (born 1967), American actor
George Riley (disambiguation), multiple people
Gillian Riley (born 1945), English writer
Gina Riley (born 1961), Australian actor
Glenn Riley (born 1992), English rugby league footballer
Glyn Riley (born 1958), English footballer
Gordon Arthur Riley (1911–1985), American oceanographer
Guy Riley (1884–1964), British Army officer
Gwendoline Riley (born 1979), English writer
Gyan Riley (born 1977), American guitarist

H
Harold Riley (disambiguation), multiple people
Harry Riley (disambiguation), multiple people
Hayden Riley (1921–1995), American basketball coach
H. Chauncey Riley (1835–1904), English missionary
Henry Riley (disambiguation), multiple people
Herbert D. Riley (1904–1973), American admiral
Herlin Riley (born 1957), American jazz drummer
Herman Riley (1933–2007), American saxophone player
Horrie Riley (1902–1970), Australian rules footballer
Howard Riley (disambiguation), multiple people
H. Sanford Riley (born 1951), Canadian lawyer
Hughen Riley (born 1947), English footballer

I
Ida Morey Riley (1856–1901), American teacher
Isaac Riley (disambiguation), multiple people
Ivan Riley (1900–1943), American athlete
Ivers Riley (1932–2015), American financier

J
Jack Riley (disambiguation), multiple people
Jake Riley (disambiguation), multiple people
Jalen Riley (born 1993), American basketball player
James Riley (disambiguation), multiple people
Janet Mary Riley (1915–2008), American activist
Jason Riley (disambiguation), multiple people
Jeannie C. Riley (born 1945), American singer
Jeannine Riley (born 1940), American actress
Jeff Riley (1880–1954), Australian rules footballer
Jenelle Riley (born 1982), American actress
Jim Riley (disambiguation), multiple people
Jo Riley, British writer
Joan Riley (born 1958), Jamaican-British author
Joe Riley (disambiguation), multiple people
Joellen Riley (born 1957), Australian lawyer
John Riley (disambiguation), multiple people
Jonathon Riley (disambiguation), multiple people
Joseph Riley (disambiguation), multiple people
Judith Merkle Riley (1942–2010), American writer
Julia Riley, English astrophysicist

K
Karon Riley (born 1978), American football player
Kate Riley, American television presenter
Ken Riley (disambiguation), multiple people
Kevin Riley (disambiguation), multiple people
Kurt Riley (born 1987), American musician

L
Larry Riley (disambiguation), multiple people
Lawrence Riley (disambiguation), multiple people
Leanne Riley (born 1993), English rugby union footballer
Lee Riley (1932–2011), American football player
Leon Riley (1906–1970), American basketball player
Les Riley (1908–1999), English cricketer
Lincoln Riley (born 1983), American football coach
Linda Riley, British journalist
Lisa Riley (born 1976), English actress
Llewellyn Riley (born 1972), Barbadian footballer
Lou Riley (1909–1989), Australian rules footballer
Lucinda Riley (1966–2021), Irish author
Luther Riley (born 1972), American basketball coach
Lynne Riley (born 1958), American politician

M
Maggie Riley (??–2015), English actress
Malcolm Riley (born 1960), British musician
Marc Riley (born 1961), British musician
Marcus Riley (born 1984), American football player
Mark Riley (disambiguation), multiple people
Martin Riley (disambiguation), multiple people
Mary Riley (disambiguation), multiple people
Matt Riley (born 1979), American baseball player
Michael Riley (disambiguation), multiple people
Mike Riley (disambiguation), multiple people
Murray Riley (1925–2020), Australian rower
Mykal Riley (born 1985), American basketball player

N
Nancy Riley (born 1958), American politician
Napoleon Riley (1881–1941), American football player
Nicky Riley (born 1986), Scottish footballer
Norma Riley, American electrical engineer
Norman Riley (disambiguation), multiple people

O

P
Pat Riley (born 1945), American basketball coach
Patrick Riley (disambiguation), multiple people
Paul Riley (disambiguation), multiple people
Perry Riley (born 1988), American football player
Peter Riley (disambiguation), multiple people
Phil Riley, English radio personality
Phillip Riley (born 1972), American football player
Polly Riley (1926–2002), American golfer
Preston Riley (born 1947), American football player

Q
Quintin Riley (1905–1980), British explorer

R
Rachael Riley (born 2004), Canadian artistic gymnast
Rachel Riley (born 1986), English television presenter
Raf Riley, English record producer
Ralph Riley (1924–1999), British geneticist
Raven Riley (born 1986), American actress
Regan Riley (born 2002), English footballer
Richard Riley (disambiguation), multiple people
Robert Riley (disambiguation), multiple people
Rochelle Riley, American columnist
Roderick Riley (born 1981), American basketball player
Ronald Riley (disambiguation), multiple people
Rueben Riley (born 1984), American football player
Ruth Riley (born 1979), American basketball player
Ryan Max Riley (born 1979), American humorist and skier

S
Sally Riley (disambiguation), multiple people
Sam Riley (born 1980), English actor
Samantha Riley (born 1972), Australian swimmer
Scribz Riley (born 1993), English producer
Sean Riley (disambiguation), multiple people
Sid Riley (1878–1964), Australian rugby union footballer
Stevan Riley, British film director
Steven Riley, English immunologist
Steve Riley (disambiguation), multiple people
Susan Riley (disambiguation), multiple people

T
Talay Riley, British singer-songwriter
Talulah Riley (born 1985), English actress
Tarrus Riley (born 1979), Jamaican-American reggae singer
Teddy Riley (born 1967), American producer
Teddy Riley (trumpeter) (1924–1992), American jazz trumpeter
Terence Riley (disambiguation), multiple people
Terry Riley (born 1935), American composer
Theodore M. Riley (1842–1914), American priest
Thomas Riley (disambiguation), multiple people
Tim Riley (disambiguation), multiple people
Tracy Riley (born 1966), New Zealand academic administrator
Trevor Riley (born 1948), Australian judge

V
Victor Riley (born 1972), American football player
Viddal Riley (born 1997), British boxer and internet personality

W
Wayne Riley (born 1962), Australian golfer
W. C. Riley (1903–1954), American football coach
Winston Riley (1943–2012), Jamaican singer
William Riley (disambiguation), multiple people
Woodbridge Riley (1869–1933), American scholar

Y
Yusef Riley (born 1993), Bermudian basketball player

Fictional characters 
Riley family, fictional family in TV series One Life to Live
Joe Riley, leading protagonist of the family on the show
Joe Riley (James Dunn), in the movie The Golden Gloves Story (1951)
Joe Riley (Eddie Quillan), in the movie Jungle Raiders (1945)
Kevin Riley, recurring junior officer character in Star Trek: The Original Series
Cpl. Scott Riley, character in Call of Duty: United Offensive
Mavis Riley (later Wilton), character from the British soap opera Coronation Street
Concepta Riley (later Hewitt and Regan), character from the British soap opera Coronation Street
Faye Riley, character in Batteries Not Included

See also
Riley (given name), people with the given name of Riley
O'Reilly, people with the surname of O'Reilly
Reilly (disambiguation), a disambiguation page for Reilly
Reilly (surname), people with the surname of Reilly
General Riley (disambiguation), a disambiguation page for Generals with the surname of Riley
Governor Riley (disambiguation), a disambiguation page for Governors with the surname of Riley
Justice Riley (disambiguation), a disambiguation page for Generals with the surname of Riley
Senator Riley (disambiguation), a disambiguation page for Senators with the surname of Riley
Over 500 articles whose title contains Riley

References

English-language surnames
Anglicised Irish-language surnames
Surnames of Irish origin
English toponymic surnames